Come On Down may refer to:

 "Come on down!", a catchphrase from the television game show The Price Is Right

Albums
 Come On Down! (album), a 1970 album by Eddie Harris
 Come On Down, a 1976 album by Del Delker
 Come On Down (EP), a 1985 EP by Green River
 Come On Down (Jimmy Ponder album), 1991
 Come On Down: The Complete MGM Recordings, a 2012 album by Every Mother's Son
 Come On Down, a 2013 album by David Gogo

Songs
 "Come On Down (From the Top of That Hill)", a 1967 single by Jackie DeShannon
 "Come On Down", a 1969 song by Savage Grace
 "Come On Down", a 1970 single by Dean Martin
 "Come On Down", a 1972 song by New Colony Six
 "Come On Down", a 1975 single by Tennessee Ernie Ford
 "Come On Down", a song by Bux from the 1976 album We Came to Play
 "Come On Down", a 1985 single by Captain Sensible
 "Come On Down", a song by Big Daddy Kane from the 1991 album Prince of Darkness
 "Come On Down", a song by TLC from the 1999 album FanMail
 "Come On Down", a song by Zed from the 2000 album Silencer
 "Come On Down" (Crystal Waters song), 2001
 "Come On Down", a song by De La Soul from the 2004 album The Grind Date
 "Come On Down", a song by Third Day from the 2010 album Move
 "Come On Down" (High Valley song), 2014

Other
 Come On Down, a 1984 BBC-produced documentary about American game shows.
 Come On Down! The Game Show Story, a 2014 ITV British documentary mini-series presented by Bradley Walsh.
 Come on Down!, a 2016 documentary about two friends who venture from Boston to Cali to crack the greatest game show in television history.